The Earle Range is a small mountain range in southwestern British Columbia, Canada, located on the east side of the south end of Prince of Wales Reach. It has an area of 158 km2 and is a subrange of the Pacific Ranges which in turn form part of the Coast Mountains.

See also
List of mountain ranges

References

Pacific Ranges